The Southern Metropolitan Football League (SMFL) was an Australian rules football competition based in the southern suburbs of Adelaide, South Australia until it folded at the end of the 1986 season. It first formed in 1912 as the Sturt Football Association,   and during its history was also known as the Mid-Southern Football Association (1920-1930), Glenelg District Football Association (1931–1949), Glenelg-South-West District Football Association (1950–1966)  and Glenelg-South Adelaide Football Association (1967–1983), before finally being named Southern Metropolitan Football League (1984–1986).

The association first affiliated with the South Australian Football League in 1921.  In 1927, the association made a special request to the SAFL for financial assistance.

Collapse 
The remaining clubs at the end of the 1986 season were distributed in 1987 as follows:
Joined SAFA – Brighton, Mitchell Park 
Joined Hills Football League – Blackwood
Joined Southern Football League - Marion, Morphettville Park,  Plympton 
Joined Central District Football Association – Ovingham 
Merged and joined SAAFL - Camden (merged with Greek FC)

Member Clubs 
Clubs in Bold indicate teams playing in the final season (1986)

Premierships

Sturt Football Association

Mid-Southern Football Association

Glenelg District Football Association

Glenelg-South-West District Football Association

Glenelg-South Adelaide Football Association

Southern Metropolitan Football League

H.S. Rugless Medallists 
The H.S. Rugless Medal was awarded to the player adjudged the Fairest and Most Brilliant in the competition.  During the Sturt Football Association years (1912–19) it was known as the Thomas Medal.

Thomas Medal 
1912
1913
1914 – Jack Rowlands (Blackwood) 
1915
1916
1917
1918
1919

H.S. Rugless Medal (A1) 
1920
1921
1922 – Mick Martin (Reynella) 
1923
1924 – Bob Chapman (Blackwood)
1925 – William Hender (Blackwood)
1926 – Purdie (Sturt)
1927 – A. "Pop" Williams (Goodwood)
1928 – A. "Pop" Williams (Goodwood)
1929
1930
1931 
1932
1933 – F. Whitford (Brighton) - 24 votes
1934
1935 – R. McNamara (Camden) 
1936 – W. Egan (Sturt)
1937 – Clarrie Radford (Blackwood) – 40 votes
1938 – F. Alcock (Reynella)
1939 – tied C. Brown (Sturt) & N. S. Gunn (Reynella)  – 34 votes
1940 – F. Alcock (Reynella) 
1941 – N. Edwards (Sturt)
1942 – C. Brooker (Plympton) 
1943
1944 – G. Cox (Sturt-Brighton)
1945 – K. Rohrig (Edwardstown)
1946 – B. Woollard (Brighton-Seacliff) 
1947 – R. (Bob) Ryan (Reynella) 
1948 – Mel Brock (Camden)
1949 – Harold Partridge (Sturt)
1950 – Max Chambers (Sturt)
1951 
1952 – Alan Naulty (South Adelaide Ramblers)
1953
1954 – P. Partridge (Sturt)
1955
1956
1957
1958
1959
1960
1961
1962
1963
1964
1965
1966
1967 – Garry Bonner (Blackwood)
1968 – J. Cook (Marion)
1969 – J. Cook (Marion)
1970 – Ian Winton (Morphettville Park)
1971
1972
1973
1974
1975
1976 – John Cloonan (Morphettville Park)
1977
1978 – Robbie Magarey (Blackwood)
1979
1980
1981 – I. Hine (Marion)
1982 – Brad Mesecke (Morphettville Park)
1983 – J. Carracher (Brighton)
1984 – Brad Mesecke (Morphettville Park)
1985 – Chris Prior (Blackwood)
1986 – Brad Mesecke (Morphettville Park)

J.C. Morrow Medal (A2) 
In 1936 the Morrow Medal was established for the fairest and most brilliant player in the then B-Grade competition.

References 

1912 establishments in Australia
1986 disestablishments in Australia
Defunct Australian rules football competitions in South Australia